Helldiver may refer to:
Grebe, a bird
Helldiver, a graffiti artist better known as ORFN
Curtiss Helldiver (disambiguation), name of several aircraft

See also 
 Helldivers